Agustín Calleri and Luis Horna were the defending champions of the 2008 Copa Telmex men's doubles tennis tournament, but did not play together that year.

Agustín Calleri partnered with Potito Starace, but lost in the semifinals to Marcel Granollers and Alberto Martín.

Luis Horna chose not to participate that year.

Seeds

Draw

Draw

External links
Main Draw

Doubles